Davisson may refer to:
 Ananias Davisson (1780–1857), American singing school teacher
 Clinton Davisson (1881–1958), American physicist
 Kyle Davisson (born 1985), American football player
 Muriel Davisson , neuroscientist
 Richard Davisson (1922—2004), American physicist
 Walther Davisson (1885-1973), German violinist and conductor
 Davisson (crater), a lunar crater